Caprovesposus parvus is an extinct, prehistoric surgeonfish from what is now the Caucasus Mountains.  Its very small fossils (up to 3 centimeters in length) are thought to represent a pelagic larval or juvenile stage.   The adult form is, as yet, unknown.

See also

 Prehistoric fish
 List of prehistoric bony fish

References

External links
 Bony fish in the online Sepkoski Database

Prehistoric ray-finned fish genera
Acanthuridae
Oligocene fish
Miocene fish
Extinct animals of Russia
Fossil taxa described in 1960